Bernárdez is a Spanish patronymic surname meaning "son of Bernardo". may refer to:

Aurora Bernárdez, writer and translator
Francisco Luis Bernárdez (1900–1978), Argentine poet, born in Buenos Aires
Jefferson Bernárdez, Honduran football forward
Manuel Bernardez (1867–1942), Spanish-born Uruguayan diplomat, poet, journalist, and editor
Robel Bernardez (born 1972), Honduran international football midfielder
Salvador Bernárdez (1953–2011), Honduran football forward
Víctor Bernárdez, Honduran football defender

See also
Barnard
Bernard
Bernardi
Bernards (disambiguation)

Spanish-language surnames
Patronymic surnames